Karren is a given name and surname, probably a variant of the name Karen. Notable people with the name include:

Thomas Karren (born 1810), Early American pioneer (Male)
Billy Karren (born 1965), American musician (Male)
Karren Brady (born 1969), British businesswoman and writer (Female)

See also

Karen (disambiguation)
Karien
Karre